Tryblidiida is a taxon of monoplacophoran molluscans containing the only extant representatives: 37 species are still alive today, inhabiting the ocean at depths of between .

History of discoveries 
The first captured living monoplacophoran was Veleropilina zografi in 1896, but at that time it was described as if it were an archaeogastropod, a true limpet, mainly because of its patelliform (limpet-like) shell. This species was finally revealed to be monoplacophoran 87 years later, in 1983.

In April 1952, a living specimen was collected from deep depths in the Middle America Trench off Costa Rica's Pacific coast. In 1957 that species was described and named Neopilina galatheae by its discoverer, Danish biologist Henning Mourier Lemche (1904–1977). An expert in the field has called this discovery "one of the greatest sensations in the [twentieth] century." As of 2008, there were 31 living species known, discovered in waters from 200 meters in depth to hadal depths, or more than 6,000 meters in the deepest ocean trenches.

The first specimen photographed alive was Vema hyalina, at a depth of 400 meters off Catalina Island, California, in 1977. Scientists believe that the taxon Monoplacophora is probably polyphyletic and have proposed including all the living members in the order Tryblidiida.

In 1989, fossils in Italy from the middle Pleistocene were described which appear to be identical with the living species Micropilina minuta.

Anatomy 

Little is known about monoplacophorans. They have a single, flat, rounded bilateral shell that is often thin and fragile; it ranges in size from 3 to 30 millimetres (in recent species). The apex of the shell is at the anterior end. The fossil shells exhibit a series of muscular attachment scars on the inner side, suggesting metamerism; indeed, with living Monoplacophora to study, it can be seen that their body segments exhibit a serial repetition of kidneys, gills and reproductive structure. This used to be interpreted as a true segmentation, which suggested a "missing link" between mollusks and annelids. More recent studies have shown that the repetition of these organs is secondary.

Monoplacophorans move on a rounded foot. Their reduced head lacks eyes or tentacles.

The mantle cavity forms a horseshoe-shaped groove running around the muscular foot, in a similar fashion to that of the chitons, and contains five or six gills on either side. The mouth opens on the underside between the ends of the groove, while the anus opens into the hindmost part. Like chitons, monoplacophorans possess a sensory subradular organ, as well as a rasping radula. A fold of ciliated tissue surrounds the mouth to the front and sides, while a smaller fold, bearing a number of tentacles, lies just behind it. The stomach contains a style, projecting from a diverticulum, or "style sac".

The mouth has a chevron-shaped lip in front of it, and bears tentacles behind it, which have various shapes and layouts in different species.

The heart is divided into two equal halves, each with its own auricle, ventricle and aorta. The left and right aorta fuse shortly after leaving the heart, and supply blood to the open circulatory system. There are six pairs of nephridial excretory organs, which empty into the mantle cavity.

The nervous system has small ganglia around the oesophagus from which two pairs of main nerve cords run through the body; one pair supplying the foot, and the other the visceral organs. As in the chitons, these main nerve cords are connected by a series of lateral nerves, giving the layout of the nervous system an appearance somewhat like a ladder.

There are two pairs of gonads, which release gametes into the water through one of the pairs of nephridia. The sexes are separate, and fertilisation is external.

Ecology

Habitat 
Monoplacophora are a geographically widespread component of the benthos. Most are known from deep water (1800 – 6500 meters), although several species are found in shallower waters ranging up to 200 meters.

Feeding habits 
It is presumed that they graze on microscopic organisms in mud or bottom detritus.

Taxonomy of extant species 
Order Tryblidiida
 Family Laevipilinidae
 Genus Laevipilina J. H. McLean, 1979
 Laevipilina antarctica Warén & Hain, 1992
 Laevipilina cachuchensis Urgorri, García-Alvarez & Luque, 2005
 Laevipilina hyalina J. H. McLean, 1979
 Laevipilina rolani Warén & Bouchet, 1990
 Laevipilina theresae Schrödl, 2006
 Family Micropilinidae
 Genus Micropilina Warén, 1989
 Micropilina arntzi Warén & Hain, 1992
 Micropilina minuta Warén, 1989
 Micropilina rakiura Marshall, 1998
 Micropilina reingi Marshall, 2006
 Micropilina tangaroa Marshall, 1992
 Micropilina wareni Marshall, 2006
 Family Monoplacophoridae
 Genus Monoplacophorus Moskalev, Starobogatov & Filatova, 1983
 Monoplacophorus zenkevitchi Moskalev, Starobogatov & Filatova, 1983
 Family Neopilinidae
 Genus Adenopilina Starobogatov & Moskalev, 1987
 Adenopilina adenensis (Tebble, 1967)
 Genus Neopilina H. Lemche, 1957
 Neopilina bruuni Menzies, 1968
 Neopilina galatheae Lemche, 1957
 Neopilina rebainsi Moskalev, Starobogatov & Filatova, 1983
 Neopilina starobogatovi Ivanov & Moskalev, 2007
 Genus Rokopella Starobogatov & Moskalev, 1987
 Rokopella brummeri Goud & Gittenberger, 1993
 Rokopella capulus Marshall, 2006
 Rokopella euglypta (Dautzenberg & Fischer, 1897)
 Rokopella goesi (Warén, 1988)
 Rokopella oligotropha (Rokop, 1972)
 Rokopella segonzaci Warén & Bouchet, 2001
 Genus Veleropilina Starobogatov & Moskalev, 1987
 Veleropilina brummeri (Goud & Gittenberger, 1993)
 Veleropilina capulus (B. A. Marshall, 2006)
 Veleropilina euglypta (Dautzenberg & H. Fischer, 1897)
 Veleropilina goesi (Warén, 1988)
 Veleropilina oligotropha (Rokop, 1972)
 Veleropilina reticulata (Seguenza, 1876)
 Veleropilina segonzaci (Warén & Bouchet, 2001)
 Veleropilina seisuimaruae Kano, S. Kimura, T. Kimura & Warén, 2012
 Veleropilina veleronis (Menzies & Layton, 1963)
 Veleropilina zografi (Dautzenberg & H. Fischer, 1896)
 Genus Vema (Clarke & Menzies, 1959)
 Vema bacescui (Menzies, 1968)
 Vema ewingi (Clarke & Menzies, 1959)
 Vema levinae Warén, 1996
 Vema occidua B. A. Marshall, 2006

References 

Monoplacophora
Mollusc orders